Aubagne Football Club is a French football club located in Aubagne, Bouches-du-Rhône.

History 
Aubagne was created in 1989 as the merger of three French clubs, L'entente Aubagnaise, SO Charrel, and Jeunesse Sportive Aubagnaise.

Colours and badge 
Aubagne's colors are yellow and blue. They had their original badge from 1989, to 2019.

Current squad

References

External links 
 Aubagne FC - Official site
 FDB Profile

Association football clubs established in 1989
Sport in Bouches-du-Rhône
Football clubs in Provence-Alpes-Côte d'Azur
1989 establishments in France